The 1977 Nevada Wolf Pack football team represented the University of Nevada, Reno during the 1977 NCAA Division II football season. Nevada competed as an independent. The Wolf Pack were led by second–year head coach Chris Ault and played their home games at Mackay Stadium.

Schedule

References

Nevada
Nevada Wolf Pack football seasons
Nevada Wolf Pack football